Pi Virginis (π Vir, π Virginis) is a binary star in the zodiac constellation of Virgo. It is visible to the naked eye with an apparent visual magnitude of 4.64. The distance to this star, based upon parallax measurements, is roughly 380 light years.

This is a spectroscopic binary system with a stellar classification of A5V. They have an orbital period of 283 days with an eccentricity of 0.27. The mass ratio of the two stars is about 0.47, with the primary having an estimated mass of around 2.2 times that of the Sun. The primary is a cool metallic-lined Am star.

References

Virginis, Pi
Virgo (constellation)
Spectroscopic binaries
A-type main-sequence stars
Virginis, 008
104321
058490
4589
Durchmusterung objects